Esad Pasha or Essad Pasha may refer to:

As'ad Pasha al-Azm (died 1758), Ottoman governor of Damascus
Ahmed Esad Pasha (1828–1875), Ottoman statesman
Essad Pasha Toptani (1863–1920), Ottoman and Albanian politician
Mehmet Esat Bülkat or Mehmed Esad Pasha (1862–1952), Ottoman general
Esatpaşa, Ataşehir, a neighborhood in Istanbul